The 2013 Supercheap Auto Bathurst 1000 was an Australian touring car motor race for V8 Supercars, the twenty-ninth race of the 2013 International V8 Supercars Championship. It was held on 13 October 2013 at the Mount Panorama Circuit in Bathurst, New South Wales.

Mark Winterbottom and Steven Richards won the race for Ford Performance Racing, ahead of the pole-sitting Triple Eight Race Engineering car of Jamie Whincup and Paul Dumbrell and their team-mates Craig Lowndes and Warren Luff. The winning race time of six hours, eleven minutes and 27.9 seconds was a new record for a full 1,000-kilometre event, beating the previous record set in 2010 by 84 seconds. Along with the 2010 race, it was the second to be covered at an average speed of over 160 kilometres per hour (100 mph).

Background
The 2013 race was the seventeenth running of the Australian 1000 race, which was first held after the organisational split between the Australian Racing Drivers Club and V8 Supercars Australia that saw two "Bathurst 1000" races contested in both 1997 and 1998, with one race open to V8 Supercar entries, and the other open to Super Touring cars. The 2013 race was also the 56th race for which the lineage can be traced back to the 1960 Armstrong 500 – held at Phillip Island – and the 53rd to be held at Mount Panorama.

With the addition of teams entering Mercedes-Benzes and Nissans it was the first time since 1998 that cars other than Fords of Holdens had entered the race. The four Nissan Altimas entered by Nissan Motorsport were the first Nissans to compete in the race since the 1998 AMP Bathurst 1000. The three Mercedes-Benz E63 AMGs entered by Erebus Motorsport were the first Mercedes-Benzes to race since the 1994 Tooheys 1000.

In addition to the twenty eight regular championship entries, one wildcard entry was accepted for the 2013 race, with Triple Eight Race Engineering providing an extra car for British driver Andy Priaulx and Swedish driver Mattias Ekström to drive under the banner of Xbox One Racing. Dick Johnson Racing ran a special livery on the car of Chaz Mostert and Dale Wood in commemoration of thirty years since Dick Johnson drove the Greens-Tuf XE Falcon, which he famously crashed in the Top 10 Shootout in 1983. The two Dick Johnson Racing cars also swapped numbers for the event, with Mostert and Wood using 17 while Tim Blanchard and Ashley Walsh used 12. The Nissan Altima of Michael Caruso and Daniel Gaunt also had a number change, using 300 in relation to the 300,000 donation to the charity Beyond Blue by Symantec (the parent company of the team's major sponsor Norton). Garry Rogers Motorsport also ran a special livery on the car of Scott McLaughlin and Jack Perkins in celebration of the team's fiftieth year in motor racing, while Britek Motorsport ran a pink livery in support of the McGrath Foundation. Danish driver Allan Simonsen had been set to race for Britek alongside David Wall, however his death at Le Mans four months earlier saw him replaced with New Zealander Chris Pither.

The Triple Eight Race Engineering drivers Jamie Whincup and Paul Dumbrell were the defending race winners.

Entry list

*Entries with a grey background were wildcard entries which did not compete in the full championship season.

Report

Free Practice
The first free practice session took place on the Thursday morning prior to the race with a duration of fifty minutes. The session was open to both championship drivers and co-drivers. Craig Lowndes set the fastest time during the session, ahead of Mark Winterbottom and Jason Bright. The second free practice session, held on Thursday afternoon, was only open to co-drivers and was forty-five minutes in length. Winterbottom's co-driver Steven Richards topped the session ahead of the Triple Eight Race Engineering co-drivers Paul Dumbrell and Warren Luff. The Mercedes-Benz E63 AMG of Andrew Thompson suffered damage after a brake line was severed by debris, causing Thompson to hit the wall at the Chase. The third free practice session was held later on Thursday, this time a one-hour-long session open to all drivers. Reigning Bathurst winner Jamie Whincup was quickest, three-quarters of a second faster than Winterbottom with David Reynolds in third. Tim Slade caused a red flag when he crashed heavily at the Cutting, damaging the car that Thompson had crashed in the previous session enough that it would not be able to take part in qualifying on Friday afternoon. Alex Davison also crashed at Reid Park, causing significant damage to the side of his car but it was repaired in time for the following day's sessions.

The fourth free practice session, a forty-five-minute session held on Friday morning, was again only open to co-drivers. Luff and Dumbrell finished ahead of the Bathurst rookie, Swede Mattias Ekström, driving the wildcard entry run by Triple Eight. The fifth free practice session was held later on Friday morning, with Whincup going fastest ahead of Bright and Will Davison. Chaz Mostert had a major accident a Reid Park, which eventually ruled the car out of qualifying. The sixth and final free practice session was held on Saturday morning for all drivers. Reynolds finished the session fastest ahead of Whincup and Fabian Coulthard. The cars of Slade and Thompson and Mostert and Dale Wood returned to the track in this session after being heavily damaged in their respective crashes on Thursday and Friday.

Summary

Qualifying
The forty-minute qualifying session took place on Friday afternoon. The session would set positions eleven to twenty-nine on the grid, with the top ten drivers advancing to the Top 10 Shootout held on Saturday afternoon. Only twenty-seven cars took part in the session, with the cars of Tim Slade and Andrew Thompson and Chaz Mostert and Dale Wood not able to be repaired in time for the session following their practice crashes. Steven Johnson qualified the #9 Erebus Motorsport Mercedes-Benz instead of regular driver Maro Engel due to his higher level of experience at the circuit.

David Reynolds led the early part of the session while several drivers went off at the Chase, including Jamie Whincup, Jason Bright and Michael Caruso. Whincup also hit the wall coming out of the Dipper but did not sustain any significant damage and no repairs were required. Whincup went on to post the fastest time, six one-hundredths of a second quicker than Mark Winterbottom. Bright, James Courtney, Shane van Gisbergen, Craig Lowndes, Will Davison, Reynolds, Scott McLaughlin and Alexandre Prémat completed the top ten, with McLaughlin and Prémat both making the Top 10 Shootout in their first qualifying attempt for the race.

Garth Tander and Lee Holdsworth, in eleventh and twelfth respectively, were knocked out of the top ten in the final moments of qualifying. They were followed by David Wall, Fabian Coulthard, Tony D'Alberto, Johnson, Caruso, rookie Mattias Ekström, James Moffat and Jonathon Webb, who completed the top twenty. The final seven positions in qualifying were taken by Tim Blanchard, Scott Pye, Todd Kelly, Rick Kelly, Russell Ingall, Alex Davison and Dean Fiore, who was just over one and a half seconds slower than Whincup's time. Despite missing qualifying, the Slade/Thompson and Mostert/Wood cars were allowed to take part in the race by the stewards.

Top 10 Shootout
The Top 10 Shootout took place later in the afternoon than in previous years, beginning at 17:00 local time. David Reynolds said that the starting time was unfair, claiming that the track is faster at the end of the hour-long session than it is at the start, thus giving the final runners an advantage. Alexandre Prémat, the first driver to take to the circuit, struggled for grip and recorded a 2:10.4145. His team-mate Scott McLaughlin then bettered his time by just over a second. Reynolds ran slightly wide at turn two and was unable to match McLaughlin's time, just five one-hundredths of a second behind. Will Davison went two-tenths of a second quicker than McLaughlin, setting a 2:09.0023, before Craig Lowndes improved on this time by half a tenth with a seemingly good lap.

Shane van Gisbergen was next to set a time and he beat Lowndes' lap by nearly seven-tenths of a second with a 2:08.2804, despite getting sideways going into the Dipper. James Courtney had a moment at the Cutting, costing him a lot of time in the first sector and he only just went quicker than Lowndes. Jason Bright then went four one-thousandths of a second faster than Van Gisbergen to be the fastest runner with two drivers still to set a lap time. Mark Winterbottom went two-tenths quicker than Bright but this was not enough to stop the final driver, Jamie Whincup, from taking pole with a time of 2:07.8825, another two-tenths quicker than Winterbottom.

Final starting grid
The following table represents the final starting grid for the race on Sunday:

Race
The race began at 10:30 local time. The cars of Dale Wood, driving with Chaz Mostert, and Andrew Thompson, driving with Tim Slade, entered the pit lane at the end of the warm-up lap to refuel, thus giving them a more flexible strategy for the race. However, the car of Mostert and Wood was given a pit lane drive-through penalty for not being jacked up while refuelling was taking place, though Mostert later claimed he saw the car up on the jacks.

Meanwhile, Paul Dumbrell had made a good start from pole while Mark Winterbottom bogged down and dropped to the back of the top ten. David Reynolds also dropped back after being forced wide at Griffins Bend on the opening lap. Dumbrell led from Jason Bright, Shane van Gisbergen, Greg Murphy, Scott McLaughlin, Warren Luff, Will Davison, Mark Winterbottom, Garth Tander and Fabian Coulthard. The two Ford Performance Racing cars of Winterbottom and Davison started to make their way forwards during the first stint. Drivers began to pit on lap 11, with Luff, Greg Ritter, Russell Ingall, Maro Engel and Matt Halliday all making a pit stop. Van Gisbergen passed Bright on lap 12 and began to pull away from him but could not catch Dumbrell, who was pulling away from the field. The first driver change occurred on lap 15, with Will Davison pitting and handing the car over to Steve Owen.

The first safety car period was called on lap 21 to clear debris after David Russell hit a kangaroo coming out of Griffins Bend. All of the leading cars pitted, with Dumbrell handing the car over to Jamie Whincup. The safety car pulled off the track at the end of lap 23, with Whincup leading from Steven Richards, Dean Canto, Luff, Owen, Luke Youlden, Ritter, James Courtney, Craig Baird and Jeroen Bleekemolen. The car of Ingall and Ryan Briscoe had made an extra pit stop during the safety car to be on an alternative strategy. Various cars were under investigation for weaving after the safety car lights went out, though no penalties were awarded. Following the safety car period, Whincup began to pull away from the field behind him, which consisted mostly of co-drivers. The car of Todd Kelly and David Russell was officially retired due to the damage caused by the incident with the kangaroo.

The next round of pit stops began on lap 34 with Ritter and Nick Percat pitting, while Luff and Owen followed on the next lap. The car of Coulthard and Youlden had a small power steering fluid leak but the problem was mended during a pit stop. Meanwhile, Whincup continued to pull away from Richards, though Alexandre Prémat was setting the fastest lap times after taking over from Ritter. Whincup pitted on lap 46, four laps after Richards. Lap 54 saw cars coming in to complete their third pit stops, with Will Davison taking over from Owen while Luff handed over to Lowndes on lap 55. By lap 67 all of the leaders had completed three pit stops. Steven Johnson had a problem with his cool suit which had frozen while Jonathon Webb lost the driver's side window on his car. Van Gisbergen endured a problem in his pit stop which caused him to go a lap down while Mostert had a similar delay with a starter motor problem. Tony D'Alberto's car was in the garage with a rear suspension problem.

With half of the race gone, Reynolds now led with an alternative fuel strategy which saw him pitting later than the other drivers. The safety car was called again on lap 85 after Murphy ran wide going into Reid Park and made heavy contact with the wall. This caught out Reynolds, who was unable to pit before being caught behind the safety car. Dumbrell, Percat, Mattias Ekström, Van Gisbergen and Alex Davison, who had gone off at the Chase, all took the opportunity to pit. The race was restarted on lap 89 with Richards leading from Will Davison, Luff, Dumbrell, Coulthard, Andrew Jones, Jack Perkins, Baird, Ritter and Ashley Walsh. Dumbrell went off at the Chase on lap 93, losing a place to Coulthard, before doing the same again on lap 97. He was pitted immediately to hand the car over to Whincup, who would drive to the end of the race. Lowndes had also taken over from Luff to drive to the finish. Richards pitted on lap 99 to hand over to Winterbottom. Jones and Perkins pitted on lap 101, handing over to Bright and McLaughlin respectively, who almost had a collision with the car of Tim Slade which was pushed out of the Erebus Motorsport garage (having had power steering problems) in front of them. At this stage, Whincup and Tander had completed six of their seven compulsory pit stops, one more than most others, but would be unable to get to the end without another two fuel stops. The car of Prémat and Ritter was given a mechanical black flag for leaking fuel due to a broken seal.

The penultimate round of pit stops began on lap 117 with Winterbottom and Lowndes pitting, followed by Whincup on lap 118 and Bright and Canto on lap 119. Michael Caruso's car had a major power steering leak, dropping fluid over the top section of the circuit. David Wall had a similar problem several laps later. Tander pitted on lap 126, leaving Ekström in the lead. Lowndes and Bright were battling for fifth position at this stage, going side by side around the final corner. Ekström pitted on lap 134, handing over to Andy Priaulx to finish the race. Winterbottom now led by just under two seconds over Whincup.

The car of Scott Pye and Paul Morris had used its fuel strategy to great effect to be in contention for a top five finish, with Morris pitting from third place on lap 138 to hand the car over to Pye. McLaughlin and Bright also pitted on this lap for the final time. Whincup pitted on lap 139, one lap before Winterbottom and Lowndes, who had hit the wall coming out of Forrests Elbow but did not damage the car. Tander was the final driver to pit on lap 145, leaving the order as Winterbottom, Whincup, Bright, Lowndes, Tander and Reynolds. Lowndes, Tander and Reynolds were far behind the leading trio but were the fastest drivers on the track, with Lowndes and Tander catching and pressuring Bright for third place and Reynolds closing in on the battle. The car of Dean Fiore and Matt Halliday had retired on lap 145 with gearbox problems.

Bright was able to defend Lowndes but this allowed Winterbottom and Whincup to build a lead. Tander got past Lowndes at Griffins Bend with a bold move up the inside and then set his sights on passing Bright. The two went side by side through the final corner, which allowed Lowndes to get a run on Tander and reclaim fourth place. However, Tander retook the position around the outside at Griffins Bend. On lap 157, Tander made a move at the Chase but he went in too deep, pushing Bright wide and allowing Lowndes into third place. Bright then ran wide at Griffins Bend, allowing Reynolds into fifth. However, a mistake in the previous pit stop had seen not enough fuel put into Reynolds' car and he was forced to pit on lap 159.

Meanwhile, the battle between Winterbottom and Whincup for the lead had been intensifying. Whincup began to push harder with two laps to go, dropping a wheel off the track coming out of the Chase on lap 160. On the final lap, Whincup drew alongside Winterbottom on the outside going into Griffins Bend and attempted to take the lead, but slid wide and lost ground. This gave Winterbottom a buffer, which he held for the rest of the lap to take the win, with Whincup under half a second behind. The victory was Winterbottom's first and Steven Richards' third. Lowndes held on for third ahead of Tander and Bright while Pye ended up sixth. Will Davison came home in seventh ahead of McLaughlin, Reynolds and Priaulx.

Van Gisbergen and Jonathon Webb were next, ahead of Alex Davison and Lee Holdsworth, who was the best of the Mercedes-Benzes in fourteenth. Tim Blanchard rounded out the top fifteen, followed by Coulthard, Ingall, Moffat, Rick Kelly and Engel, who was the first car a lap down. Mostert finished in twenty-first after a troublesome weekend, with Wall, Prémat, D'Alberto, Caruso and Slade the last of those who finished and all with assorted problems during the day.

Classification

Qualifying

Notes:
 – The car of Chaz Mostert and Dale Wood was unable to take part in qualifying due to a crash in the fifth free practice session.
 – The car of Tim Slade and Andrew Thompson was unable to take part in qualifying due to a crash in the third free practice session.

Top 10 Shootout

Race

Notes:
 – Car numbers 17 and 47 started from the pit lane.
 – Todd Kelly did not drive car number 7 during the race.

Championship standings after the race
 After 29 of 36 races.

Drivers' Championship standings

Teams' Championship standings

 Note: Only the top five positions are included for both sets of standings.

References

Supercheap Auto Bathurst 1000
Motorsport in Bathurst, New South Wales